Manduessedum or Manduesedum was a Roman fort and later a civilian small town in the Roman Province of Britannia. It was located on and immediately to the east of the site of the modern village of Mancetter, located in the English county of Warwickshire, close to the modern town of Atherstone.

The fort was founded in around AD 50 on the Watling Street Roman road. The final battle of the rebel queen of the Britons Boudica at the Battle of Watling Street in AD 60/61 may have taken place near Manduessedum. The British forces were defeated by the Roman general Suetonius Paullinus. The fort appears to have been fairly short lived, as there is little sign of military occupation at the site after AD 70.

Manduessedum later developed into an important civilian settlement, and was the centre of an extensive pottery making industry which primarily produced Mortaria (mixing bowls). The remains of up to 70 pottery kilns dating from the Roman period have been found in the area, as well as the remains of a Roman villa. The area has been listed as a scheduled monument.

References

 Slater, Terry, A History of Warwickshire (1981)

External links
 Roman Mancetter - page of the Atherstone Civic Society
 

Structures on the Heritage at Risk register in Warwickshire
Populated places established in the 1st century
History of Warwickshire
Military history of Warwickshire
Scheduled monuments in Warwickshire
Roman fortifications in England
Roman towns and cities in England